Banno is a 2021 Pakistani soap television serial produced by Abdullah Kadwani and Asad Qureshi under their banner 7th Sky Entertainment.The drama serial is written by Tahir Nazir and Athar Ansari. It features Furqan Qureshi, Nimra Khan, Farhan Ahmed Malhi, Nawal Saeed and Maryam Noor in leading roles.  The supporting cast includes Rabia Noreen, Hashim Butt, Seemi Pasha, Khalifa Sajeeruddin, Ayesha Gul, Yasir Alam, Fareeda Shabbir, Naveed Raza and Humaira Bano.

Plot 
Omar  reaches the point in life where she has to choose between love and friendship. After hiding her long-distance relationship from her dearest cousin for years, Beena still hesitates in disclosing it to Sania when their cousin, Azlan, finally returns to Pakistan. Her reluctance eventually leads to a tragic turn in everyone's life as Sania falls in love with Azlan while their mothers also find them to be a perfect match for marriage.

Being an orphan, Beena lacks the courage to speak her heart out, knowing how much Sania's mother already despises her existence. Beena ends up feeling obliged to prove her loyalty to Sania and sees no point in returning Azlan's phone calls, who had actually promised to make their relationship exclusive.

However, when Nihal's gaze meets Beena's unmarred beauty, he doesn't let anyone stop him from marrying her— not even his disapproving parents. His unconditional love for Beena makes her an easy target for more hatred as his cousin, Ramsha, finds herself more worthy of Nihal's companionship. While Beena struggles for peace in her new home, Azlan refuses to give love another chance.

Cast

Main roles 
 Nimra Khan as Beena
 Furqan Qureshi as Azlan
 Farhan Ahmed Malhi as Nihal
 Nawal Saeed as Sania
 Maryam Noor as Ramsha

Supporting roles 
 Rabia Noreen as Arfah, Sania's mother
 Ayesha Gul as Sajda, Azlan's mother
 Fareeda Shabbir as Ayesha
 Hashim Butt as Karim, Nihal's father
 Seemi Pasha as Riffat, Nihal's mother
 Khalifa Sajeeruddin as Sheheryar, Sania's father
 Humaira Bano as Midhat, Ramsha's mother
 Yasir Alam as Aman, Nihal's friend
 Birjees Farooqui as Sadia's mother, Midhat's friend
 Talia Jan as Abiha, Ramsha's friend
 Naveed Raza as Saqib, Ramsha's friend
 Sohail Sameer as Boss, Beena's boss
 Mehmood Jaffery as Lawyer
 Saba as Nasreen, Riffat's house maid

Release 
It premiered on 29 September 2021 and airs daily at 7:00 P.M on Geo Entertainment. It is digitally available to stream on YouTube and in some countries on VIU App.

Soundtrack 
The original soundtrack of Banno is sung by Sahir Ali Bagga & Aima Baig. The music is composed by Sahir Ali Bagga on lyrics by M. Mujtaba.

References 

Pakistani drama television series
2021 Pakistani television series debuts
Urdu-language television shows
Geo TV original programming
2022 Pakistani television series endings